Pheidole harlequina is a species of ant in the genus Pheidole. It was discovered and described by American biologist E. O. Wilson in 2003. Distribution:República Dominicana (La Vega Prov.)

References

harlequina
Hymenoptera of North America
Endemic fauna of Hispaniola
Insects described in 2003
Taxa named by E. O. Wilson